Sara Wojcicki Jimenez (born 1979), was a Republican member of the Illinois House of Representatives representing the 99th district since her appointment in 2015. The 99th district includes Auburn, Berlin, Chatham, Curran, Divernon, Leland Grove, New Berlin, Thayer and the majority of the state's capitol Springfield.

She was appointed to replace Raymond Poe who resigned to become the Director of the Illinois Department of Agriculture.  Prior to the appointment, she was the Chief of Staff to First Lady Diana Rauner and a television reporter.

Wojcicki Jimenez announced she would not seek reelection in 2018. She was succeeded by fellow Republican Mike Murphy.

On February 26, 2019, Senate Minority Leader Bill Brady appointed Wojcicki Jimenez to the Capitol Historic Preservation Board.

References

External links
Biography, bills and committees at 99th Illinois General Assembly
By session: 99th

Living people
American politicians of Polish descent
People from Sangamon County, Illinois
Southern Illinois University Edwardsville alumni
University of Illinois at Springfield alumni
Republican Party members of the Illinois House of Representatives
Women state legislators in Illinois
21st-century American politicians
21st-century American women politicians
1979 births